Killing Patient Zero is a Canadian documentary film, directed by Laurie Lynd and released in 2019. The film is a portrait of Gaëtan Dugas, the Canadian man who was one of the earliest diagnosed HIV/AIDS patients in North America, but became incorrectly demonized as "patient zero" for the epidemic after his role in the early story of the disease was used to illustrate contact tracing in Randy Shilts's 1987 book And the Band Played On.

The film premiered on April 26, 2019, at the Hot Docs Canadian International Documentary Festival. It was released commercially on July 26, 2019.

References

External links 
 

2019 documentary films
2019 films
2019 LGBT-related films
Canadian documentary films
Canadian LGBT-related films
Documentary films about gay men
Documentary films about HIV/AIDS
Films directed by Laurie Lynd
2010s English-language films
HIV/AIDS in Canadian films
2010s Canadian films